Priwall may refer to

 Priwall Peninsula, in Germany
 Priwall (barque), a German Flying P-Liner sailing ship

de:Priwall